James Barnes (born 1842) was a farmer, lumberman, railway contractor and political figure in New Brunswick, Canada. He represented Kent County in the Legislative Assembly of New Brunswick from 1895 to 1908 as a Liberal member.

He was born in Toronto and later came to Bouctouche, New Brunswick. Barnes married a Miss Smith there. He ran unsuccessfully for a seat in the provincial assembly in 1892.

References 
The Canadian parliamentary companion, 1897, JA Gemmill

1842 births
20th-century deaths
New Brunswick Liberal Association MLAs